Klimovskaya is a rural locality (a village) in Paustovskoye Rural Settlement, Vyaznikovsky District, Vladimir Oblast, Russia. The population was 76 as of 2010.

Geography 
Klimovskaya is located 27 km south of Vyazniki (the district's administrative centre) by road. Oktyabrskaya is the nearest rural locality.

References 

Rural localities in Vyaznikovsky District